This is a list of butterflies of Chad. About 46 species are known from Chad, 1 of which is  endemic.

Papilionidae

Papilioninae

Leptocercini
Graphium angolanus baronis (Ungemach, 1932)
Graphium ridleyanus (White, 1843)
Graphium leonidas (Fabricius, 1793)
Graphium latreillianus theorini (Aurivillius, 1881)
Graphium ucalegonides (Staudinger, 1884)

Pieridae

Coliadinae
Eurema brigitta (Stoll, [1780])
Eurema hecabe solifera (Butler, 1875)
Catopsilia florella (Fabricius, 1775)
Colias croceus (Geoffroy, 1785)

Pierinae
Colotis aurora evarne (Klug, 1829)
Colotis celimene sudanicus (Aurivillius, 1905)
Colotis danae eupompe (Klug, 1829)
Colotis ephyia (Klug, 1829)
Colotis euippe euippe (Linnaeus, 1758)
Colotis euippe mirei  Bernardi, 1960
Colotis fausta (Olivier, 1807)
Colotis liagore (Klug, 1829)
Colotis phisadia (Godart, 1819)
Colotis pleione nilus  Talbot, 1942
Colotis protomedia (Klug, 1829)
Calopieris eulimene (Klug, 1829)
Eronia leda (Boisduval, 1847)
Pinacopterix eriphia tritogenia (Klug, 1829)
Euchloe falloui (Allard, 1867)

Pierini
Pontia daplidice (Linnaeus, 1758)
Pontia glauconome  Klug, 1829
Dixeia doxo (Godart, 1819)
Belenois aurota (Fabricius, 1793)

Lycaenidae

Miletinae

Miletini
Lachnocnema abyssinica  Libert, 1996

Aphnaeinae
Cigaritis baghirmii (Stempffer, 1946)
Cigaritis buchanani (Rothschild, 1921)
Cigaritis nilus (Hewitson, 1865)
Axiocerses harpax kadugli  Talbot, 1935

Theclinae
Myrina silenus (Fabricius, 1775)
Iolaus sudanicus  Aurivillius, 1905
Deudorix livia (Klug, 1834)

Polyommatinae

Polyommatini
Tarucus legrasi  Stempffer, 1948
Tarucus rosacea (Austaut, 1885)
Tarucus ungemachi  Stempffer, 1942
Azanus moriqua (Wallengren, 1857)
Chilades eleusis (Demaison, 1888)

Nymphalidae

Satyrinae

Melanitini
Melanitis libya  Distant, 1882

Charaxinae

Charaxini
Charaxes viola  Butler, 1866
Charaxes nichetes leopardinus  Plantrou, 1974

Nymphalinae

Nymphalini
Hypolimnas misippus (Linnaeus, 1764)

Heliconiinae

Acraeini
Acraea caecilia (Fabricius, 1781)

See also
List of ecoregions in Chad
Geography of Chad

References

Seitz, A. Die Gross-Schmetterlinge der Erde 13: Die Afrikanischen Tagfalter. Plates 
Seitz, A. Die Gross-Schmetterlinge der Erde 13: Die Afrikanischen Tagfalter. Text (in German)

Butterflies
Chad
Chad
Chad
Butterflies